William Victor Adams (10 May 1921 – June 1997) was an English professional footballer who played in the Football League as a defender.

Adams joined Plymouth Argyle in April 1945. But he played here as of 1947. In the eve of New Year holiday in 1947 Plymouth Argyle played in the Second Division against Chesterfield (final score 1–4) before he left the club. After the season Adams returned to Plymouth United.

References
General
 . Retrieved 28 October 2013.
Specific

1921 births
1997 deaths
Footballers from Plymouth, Devon
English footballers
Association football defenders
Plymouth Argyle F.C. players
English Football League players